The Group of the One and Only was a minor rebel group that fought in the Syrian Civil War. The group was composed of foreigners and Syrians. The group's leader, Amir Al Bara, and an unknown number of fighters, reportedly left Latakia and later joined the Islamic State of Iraq and the Levant in 2016.

See also
 List of armed groups in the Syrian Civil War

References

Anti-government factions of the Syrian civil war